Andre Handles Them All (German: André schafft sie alle) is a 1985 West German comedy film directed by Peter Fratzscher and starring  Franco Nero, Ingrid Steeger and Maja Maranow. It was shot in Vienna and West Berlin. The film's sets were designed by the art director Rainer Schaper.

Partial cast
 Franco Nero as André
 Ingrid Steeger as Lisa Strauber
 Maja Maranow as Isabella
 Willeke van Ammelrooy as Charlie
 Dolores Schmidinger as Toni
 Elisabeth Gnaiger as Ursula
 Peter Behrens as Bruno
 Stephan Paryla as Floriot
 Reiner Anders as Poldi
 Eddy Steinblock as Robbie
 Sybille Kos as Molly

References

Bibliography
 Enjott Schneider. Handbuch Filmmusik I. Musikdramaturgie im Neuen Deutschen Film. 2018.

External links 
 

1985 films
1985 comedy films
German comedy films
West German films
1980s German-language films
Films directed by Peter Fratzscher
1980s German films